Gemini Film Circuit is a film distribution and production studio unit in Chennai, Tamil Nadu, India.

Career
The company was founded by Ravi Shankar Prasad who also owned Anand Cine Services and it went on to produce and distribute many successful Tamil films including the remakes of Rajkumar Hirani films like Vasool Raja MBBS, Shankar Dada MBBS, Shankar Dada Zindabad & Nanban. However the failure of Mani Ratnam's Kadal (2013) affected company's finances after the venture became a surprise failure at the box office, and distributors of Kadal wanted compensation before Madha Gaja Raja was released. The company made its comeback co-producing and distributing the Malayalam film Unda (2019).

Filmography

As producer

Released

As Distributor

Released

Notes

References

Film production companies based in Chennai
Film production companies of India
Companies with year of establishment missing